Cellefrouin is a commune in the Charente department in southwestern France. It is the site of the remains of the canonry of Cellefrouin, founded in 1025 by Arnald of Vitabre, bishop of Périgueux.

Population

See also
Communes of the Charente department

References

Communes of Charente